Schwa (Ә ә; italics: Ә ә) is a letter of the Cyrillic script, derived from the Latin letter schwa. It is currently used in Abkhaz, Bashkir, Dungan, Itelmen, Kalmyk, Kazakh, Kurdish, Uyghur and Tatar. It was also used in Azeri, Karakalpak, and Turkmen before those languages switched to the Latin alphabet. The Azeri and some other Latin-derived alphabets contain a letter of similar appearance (Ə/ə).

Usage

In Dungan, it represents the close-mid back unrounded vowel .

In Kurdish it represents the schwa  or the sound .

In Abkhaz, it is a modifier letter, which represents labialization of the preceding consonant . It is transliterated into Latin as a high ring .

Related letters and other similar characters
Ӛ ӛ: Cyrillic Schwa with diaeresis
Ä ä: Latin letter A with diaeresis
Ӓ ӓ: Cyrillic letter A with diaeresis
Æ æ: Ligature Æ, an Icelandic, Danish and Norwegian letter.
Ӕ ӕ: Cyrillic letter Æ
Ə ə: Latin schwa, used to transliterate Azerbaijani's Cyrillic schwa and 1927—1940 Turkmen's schwa. (Now ä for a schwa in Cyrillic)

Computer codes

References

Cyrillic letters
Ә